Actinodoria argentea is a species of bristle fly in the family Tachinidae.

Distribution
Trinidad and Tobago.

References

Exoristinae
Diptera of North America
Insects of Trinidad and Tobago
Insects described in 1964